Zucc or ZUCC may refer to:

Mark Zuckerberg
Mats Zuccarello
Zucc., taxonomic author abbreviation of Joseph Gerhard Zuccarini (1797–1848), German botanist
Zhejiang University City College

See also
 Succ (disambiguation)
 Zuck (disambiguation)
 Zuch, a defunct motorcycle manufacturer